Jaakko Lepola (born 14 March 1990) is a Finnish professional footballer who plays as a midfielder.

Career
After his contract with FC Honka expired after the 2011 season, he signed a 1+1 year contract with FC Lahti

On 29 May 2019, Lepola was loaned out from IF Gnistan to KäPa.

On 11 January 2020, Lepola joined PK-35 in Kakkonen.

References

External links
Guardian Football 

1990 births
Living people
Finnish footballers
FC Honka players
FC Lahti players
IF Gnistan players
FC Espoo players
HIFK Fotboll players
Käpylän Pallo players
Kakkonen players
Ykkönen players
Veikkausliiga players
Association football midfielders
Footballers from Espoo